The rivers of Armenia are part of either the Caspian Sea or Lake Sevan watersheds. The longest river, Aras, has been mentioned in the Old Testament as one of the four sacred rivers of the Garden of Eden. There are about 9480 rivers and small streams in Armenia.

List of rivers

Approximately 4.7 percent of the territory of Armenia consists of rivers. The longest river of Armenia is the Aras (also called Araks, Arax), which lies on the country's border with Iran and a large part of the border with Turkey. Its major tributaries are the Akhuryan, Kasagh, Hrazdan, Azat, Arpa, Vorotan and Voghji rivers. The longest rivers in northwest part of the country are the Debed and Aghstafa, while shorter ones include the Dzoraget and the Pambak.

Most of Armenia is drained into the Caspian Sea by the Araks or its tributary, the Hrazdan, which flows from Lake Sevan. The following table is the list data about the longest or most notable rivers of Armenia:

See also
 Geography of Armenia
 List of lakes of Armenia

References

 
Rivers
Armenia